The , World War II Allied reporting name "Bob", was an experimental fighter aircraft designed for the Imperial Japanese Army and meant as a replacement for the Kawasaki Ki-10. It flew in 1936, but was never produced for actual use as the Army chose the Nakajima Ki-27.

Design & Development
The Ki-28 was initially produced by Kawasaki Kōkūki Kōgyō K.K. in response to Japanese army specifications for a fighter to replace the existing Kawasaki Ki-10. In mid-1935, Kawasaki, Mitsubishi and Nakajima were instructed to build competitive prototypes. The Kawasaki design was based on its earlier, but unsuccessful Ki-5. It was a low-wing cantilever monoplane of all-metal construction, except for fabric-covered control surfaces, with a conventional tail unit, fixed tailskid landing gear and powered by a  Kawasaki Ha 9-II-Ko liquid-cooled inline V12 engine.

Service trials proved that the Kawasaki Ki-28 was the fastest of the three contenders, but the Nakajima Ki-27 was by far the most maneuverable and had the lowest wing-loading, and on this basis was selected by the Imperial Japanese Army Air Force. Despite losing to the Ki-27, the Ki-28 provided Kawasaki with valuable experience which would later help with development of the Kawasaki Ki-60 and Kawasaki Ki-61 fighters.

Mistakenly believing the Ki-28 to have entered production in Japan as the Army Type 97 Fighter, the Allies assigned it the reporting name "Bob" during World War II.

Operators

Military operators

 Imperial Japanese Army Air Force

Specifications

See also

References

Further reading

 
 
 Unknown Author(s). Famous Aircraft of the World, no.76: Japanese Army Experimental Fighters (1). Tokyo, Japan: Bunrin-Do Co. Ltd., August 1976.
 Wieliczko, Leszek A. and Zygmunt Szeremeta. Nakajima Ki 27 Nate (bilingual Polish/English). Lublin, Poland: Kagero, 2004. .

Ki-028
Ki-28, Kawasaki
Single-engined tractor aircraft
Low-wing aircraft
Abandoned military aircraft projects of Japan